Union North is a design studio with offices in Liverpool and Brighton, England.

Selected Projects

Midland Hotel (Morecambe)

The Midland Hotel is an example of Art Deco architecture in the UK. Union North acted as architects for the restoration and refurbishment of the hotel. The project was notable as being part of wider measures to regenerate Morecambe.

Three Towers Manchester

Union North refurbished 3 derelict towerblocks in Manchester. This project was noted by Architects' Journal as a viable commercial and sustainable alternative to demolition.

Greenland Street Gallery

The A Foundation commissioned Union North to design a new entrance and circulation area for a collection of industrial buildings that were to comprise the Greenland Street Gallery. This project was shortlisted by Architects' Journal for its Small Projects award.

Park Street

Union North beat competition from architects BDP, 3XN, Studio Egret West, Feilden Clegg Bradley to design a housing scheme in the Park Street/Grafton Street area of Dingle, South Liverpool.

MPV

MPV has gained interest from architectural publications all over the world. Union North were featured in the Korean architectural journal Archiworld.

Awards
Liverpool Society of Architects Awards 2008.

References

External links
Official Website
Flickr Photostream

Architecture firms of England
Companies based in Liverpool